Elemente der Mathematik is a peer-reviewed scientific journal covering mathematics. It is published by the European Mathematical Society Publishing House on behalf of the Swiss Mathematical Society. It was established in 1946 by Louis Locher-Ernst, and transferred to the Swiss Mathematical Society in 1976. Rather than publishing research papers, it focuses on survey papers aimed at a broad audience.

References

External links

Print: 
Online: 

Mathematics journals
Multilingual journals
Publications established in 1947
European Mathematical Society academic journals